The Kitsap Sun is a daily newspaper published in Bremerton, Washington, United States. It covers general news and serves Kitsap, Jefferson, and Mason counties on the west side of Puget Sound. It has a circulation of about 30,000 while reaching over 100,000 adult readers seven days a week.

Publication of The Sun began in 1935 as the Bremerton Sun to compete with the Seattle Star directly across Puget Sound. Four years later, the circulation of the Sun surpassed that of its competitor.

In 1940, John P. Scripps Newspaper Group acquired the newspaper.  In June 1984, it formally changed names from the Bremerton Sun to The Sun. It was merged with the E. W. Scripps Company in 1986 and began publishing a Sunday morning edition in 1991. On May 22, 2005, the newspaper was renamed the Kitsap Sun to reflect the regional nature of its coverage. The company spun off its newspaper assets into Journal Media Group in April 2015. The University of Washington Library holds copies of the Kitsap Sun from 1935 to present.

Notable staff 

 Adele Ferguson, columnist from 1945 to 1993 and first full-time female reporter at the Washington State Legislature in Olympia

Notes

External links

Newspapers carried by University of Washington Libraries
Echo Media: Bremerton Kitsap Sun

Kitsap County, Washington
Newspapers published in Washington (state)
Gannett publications
Publications established in 1935
1935 establishments in Washington (state)
Daily newspapers published in the United States
Bremerton, Washington